The 2023 McKendree Bearcats men's volleyball team represents McKendree University in the 2023 NCAA Division I & II men's volleyball season. The Bearcats, led by tenth year head coach Nickie Sanlin, play their home games at Melvin Price Convocation Center. The Bearcats are members of the Midwestern Intercollegiate Volleyball Association and were picked to finish fifth the MIVA in the preseason poll.

Season highlights
Will be filled in as the season progresses.

Roster

Schedule
TV/Internet Streaming information:
All home games will be televised on GLVC SN. Most road games will also be streamed on the oppositions streaming service. 

 *-Indicates conference match.
 Times listed are Central Time Zone.

Announcers for televised games
BYU: Jarom Jordan, Steve Vail, & Kenzie Koerber  
UC Irvine: No commentary
NJIT: Alex Gruberman
Central State: 
Harvard: 
Missouri S&T: 
LIU: 
Ohio State: 
Ball State: 
Lindenwood: 
Quincy: 
Purdue Fort Wayne: 
Loyola Chicago: 
Lewis: 
King: 
Lewis: 
Purdue Fort Wayne: 
Ball State: 
Ohio State: 
Quincy: 
Lindenwood:

Rankings 

^The Media did not release a Pre-season poll.

References

2023 in sports in Illinois
2023 NCAA Division I & II men's volleyball season
2023 Midwestern Intercollegiate Volleyball Association season